Landtag elections in the Free State of Mecklenburg-Schwerin (Freistaat Mecklenburg-Schwerin) during the Weimar Republic were held at irregular intervals between 1919 and 1932. Results with regard to the total vote, the percentage of the vote won and the number of seats allocated to each party are presented in the tables below. On 31 March 1933, the sitting Landtag was dissolved by the Nazi-controlled central government and reconstituted to reflect the distribution of seats in the national Reichstag. The Landtag subsequently was formally abolished as a result of the "Law on the Reconstruction of the Reich" of 30 January 1934 which replaced the German federal system with a unitary state.

1919
The 1919 Mecklenburg-Schwerin state election was held on 26 January 1919 to elect the 64 members of the Landtag.

1920
The 1920 Mecklenburg-Schwerin state election was held on 13 June 1920 to elect the 64 members of the Landtag.

1921
The 1921 Mecklenburg-Schwerin state election was held on 13 March 1921 to elect the 67 members of the Landtag.

1924
The 1924 Mecklenburg-Schwerin state election was held on 17 February 1924 to elect the 64 members of the Landtag.

1926
The 1926 Mecklenburg-Schwerin state election was held on 6 June 1926 to elect the 50 members of the Landtag.

1927
The 1927 Mecklenburg-Schwerin state election was held on 22 May 1927 to elect the 52 members of the Landtag.

1929
The 1929 Mecklenburg-Schwerin state election was held on 23 June 1929 to elect the 51 members of the Landtag.

1932
The 1932 Mecklenburg-Schwerin state election was held on 5 June 1932 to elect the 59 members of the Landtag.

References

Elections in Mecklenburg-Western Pomerania
Elections in the Weimar Republic
Mecklenburg-Schwerin
Mecklenburg-Schwerin
Mecklenburg-Schwerin
Mecklenburg-Schwerin
Mecklenburg-Schwerin
Mecklenburg-Schwerin
Mecklenburg-Schwerin
Mecklenburg-Schwerin